The Together Forever Tour was a 1987 concert tour by Run-D.M.C. and the Beastie Boys which consisted of 37 USA dates. The two groups had toured together in the previous year on Run-D.M.C.'s Raising Hell Tour, which was in support of the album of the same name.

Tour dates

References

Beastie Boys concert tours
1987 concert tours
Run-DMC concert tours